is a passenger railway station on the Saitama Rapid Railway Line located in Midori-ku, Saitama, Saitama Prefecture, Japan, operated by the third-sector railway operator Saitama Railway Corporation.

Lines

Station layout
The station has an island platform serving two ground-level tracks. An additional side platform (platform 3) is located on the opposite side of track 2 for use during special events at the nearby Saitama Stadium attended by large crowds. All platforms are equipped with chest-height platform edge doors.

Platforms

Facilities and accessibility
The elevated station concourse and ground-level platforms all have elevator access. Universal access toilets are available on the concourse level.

History
Urawa-misono Station opened on 28 March 2001 with the opening of the Saitama Rapid Railway Line.

Buses

Passenger statistics
In fiscal 2019, the station was used by an average of 11,220 passengers daily.

Surrounding area

 Saitama Stadium 2002
 Aeon Mall Urawa Misono shopping mall
 Urawa University
 Mejiro University (Saitama campus)
 
 
 Osaki Park
 Ayase River

See also
 List of railway stations in Japan

References

External links

  

Railway stations in Saitama Prefecture
Railway stations in Saitama (city)
Railway stations in Japan opened in 2001